Needle's Eye is a  pyramid Grade II* listed building which is situated in Wentworth, South Yorkshire in northern England. Needle's Eye is one of several follies in and around Wentworth Woodhouse park; the others include Hoober Stand and Keppel's Column.

History
It was constructed approximately in the mid-late 18th century and believed to have been made in order to win a wager, where the second Marquess of Rockingham claimed he was able to "drive a coach and horses through an eye of a needle". John Carr designed Needle's Eye alongside some other follies in the area.

One side of the structure is heavily pockmarked. It is alleged execution by firing squad may have taken place at the building since they resemble Musket balls; however this is unsubstantiated.

Location
Needle's Eye is situated between two disused horse and carriage paths. The area is open to public.

Structure
The wideness of the archway is roughly enough for a coach and horses to pass through, which fits its alleged purpose of creation.

See also
Grade II* listed buildings in South Yorkshire
Listed buildings in Wentworth, South Yorkshire

References

Buildings and structures in the Metropolitan Borough of Rotherham
Grade II* listed buildings in South Yorkshire
Wentworth, South Yorkshire